A Clockwork Sodom / Tentacles of Destruction is an EP by grindcore band Agoraphobic Nosebleed. The music on this EP was recorded shortly after Altered States of America was completed, featuring the same line-up. The EP featured a more metal sound than previous efforts. The songs were meant to be a contrast to "the absurdity of Altered States of America", and so were all written to be longer than 2 minutes. The release was a one-time pressing, limited to 800 copies. The front cover was done by German artist Florian Bertmer.

Track listing 

Agoraphobic Nosebleed albums
2007 EPs